St Albans is a large, inner-northern suburb of Christchurch, New Zealand, located directly north of the Christchurch Central Business District. It is the second largest suburb in the city by population (behind Halswell), with a population of 13,137 at the 2018 Census. The suburb falls within the Christchurch Central electorate and is represented by Duncan Webb, who has been the member of parliament since the 2017 general election. St Albans is one of the most diverse residential neighbourhoods in Christchurch, with a wide range of densities, architectural styles and housing ages throughout the suburb. It has everything from run-down high-density council-owned flats, to modern luxurious high-density flats and apartments; old mid-density workers cottages through to large low-density estates of various ages.

History
Originally a working-class settlement, St Albans was a separate borough from 1881 until 1903 when it became part of Christchurch City. St Albans was named after George Dickinson's farm, which lay to the south of the St Albans Creek. He had called his farm St Albans in memory of his cousin Harriet Mellon, an actress, who had become the Duchess of St Albans.

Earthquake damage
The suburb escaped severe damage in the 2010 Canterbury earthquake. Many chimneys came down but only a few complete houses were affected. In the 22 February 2011 earthquake, however, the suburb was hit hard. Many houses, supermarkets, and shops were significantly damaged with a lot ending up totally demolished. In July 2011, the demolition of the former library, which houses the community centre, was ordered by the Canterbury Earthquake Recovery Authority. By 2014 the extent of the damage to drainage systems and lowered ground levels had become apparent, with the regular flooding of a series of streets known as the Flockton Basin.

Boundaries
The suburb of St Albans is bordered by:
 Merivale to the west (West of Papanui Road – South of Innes Road)
 Strowan to the north-west (West of Papanui Road – North of Innes Road)
 Papanui to the north (North of Tomes Road)
 Mairehau to the north-east (East of Jamieson Avenue, Severn Street and Forfar Street – North of Warrington Street)
 Edgeware to the east (East of Forfar Street – South of Warrington Street and East of Madras Street – North of Bealey Avenue)
 Christchurch Central City to the south (South of Bealey Avenue).

Inconsistencies

The borders of St Albans are often disputed, particularly by real estate agents who often list upper-class properties that lie within western St Albans as belonging to Merivale instead. The original borough of St Albans stretched to include most of modern-day Edgeware, Mairehau and Merivale as well as the current St Albans suburb. There is a sign off of Bealey Avenue which points to St Albans down Barbadoes Street which is actually in the middle of the suburb of Edgeware instead of St Albans.

Demographics

St Albans had a population of 13,137 at the 2018 New Zealand census, an increase of 369 people (2.9%) since the 2013 census, and an increase of 150 people (1.2%) since the 2006 census. There were 5,448 households. There were 6,498 males and 6,633 females, giving a sex ratio of 0.98 males per female, with 2,043 people (15.6%) aged under 15 years, 3,231 (24.6%) aged 15 to 29, 6,087 (46.3%) aged 30 to 64, and 1,773 (13.5%) aged 65 or older.

Ethnicities were 82.9% European/Pākehā, 7.0% Māori, 2.0% Pacific peoples, 12.8% Asian, and 2.9% other ethnicities (totals add to more than 100% since people could identify with multiple ethnicities).

The proportion of people born overseas was 28.0%, compared with 27.1% nationally.

Although some people objected to giving their religion, 50.6% had no religion, 36.7% were Christian, 2.2% were Hindu, 0.8% were Muslim, 1.2% were Buddhist and 3.8% had other religions.

Of those at least 15 years old, 3,894 (35.1%) people had a bachelor or higher degree, and 1,098 (9.9%) people had no formal qualifications. The employment status of those at least 15 was that 6,387 (57.6%) people were employed full-time, 1,638 (14.8%) were part-time, and 324 (2.9%) were unemployed.

Community facilities

The hub of St Albans is Edgeware Village on Edgeware Road which contains a small number of well-supported shops. The three main parks in the suburb are St Albans Park, Abberley Park, and Malvern Park. Sports facilities include Canterbury United Football Club's stadium, English Park, and Rugby Park, the home of the Crusaders professional rugby union team.

Education
The suburb contains two primary schools, St Albans Primary School and St Albans Catholic School, which both provide education for years 1 to 6. St Albans School opened in 1873 and St Albans Catholic School opened in 1955.

St Albans News
St Albans is known for its sense of cohesiveness and community spirit. This has manifested itself in the local monthly paper, the St Albans Neighbourhood News, which was first published by a group of local residents in 1993 and is still going to this day under the name of St Albans News. Distributed to 5,000 homes and businesses, the paper has recently been expanded to fill 16 pages. Over the years it has been central in numerous community-related issues including local planning, Packe Street Park, the Edgeware Road Tragedy, and the closure of Edgeware swimming pool (to which it was editorially opposed). After the community regained control of the pool site, it was announced that the pool would be rebuilt with a generous donation from a local resident.

Notable residents
 Hugh Acland (1874–1956), prominent surgeon and later owner of Chippenham
 John Evans Brown (1827–1895), first MP for St Albans, after whom Browns Rd is named, and resident at Chippenham
 Richard Hadlee (born 1951), international cricketer
 Violet Targuse (1884–1937), playwright, lived on Bretts Road at time of death
 The Wizard of New Zealand (born 1932), lived in the suburb until his Cranford Street home was destroyed by fire in September 2003

References

External links
  St Albans Community Centre

Suburbs of Christchurch